Baie-D'Urfé station is a commuter rail station operated by Exo in Baie-D'Urfé, Quebec, Canada. It is served by the Vaudreuil–Hudson line.

 on weekdays, 10 of 11 inbound trains and 11 of 12 outbound trains on the line call at this station; the one exception each way is a short turned train. On weekends, all trains (four on Saturday and three on Sunday in each direction) call here.

The station is located north of the Boulevard Morgan underpass under Autoroute 20, and is connected to the end of the underpass via a stairwell and a level crossing over both the CN and CP tracks. It has two side platforms; access between them is provided by the level crossings. The inbound platform is equipped with shelters but there is no station building.

The first Baie-D'Urfé station was opened in 1899; it was originally named Bayview until 1902. This station was closed and replaced by the current station, located just east of the original site, by 1972.

Bus connections

Société de transport de Montréal

References

External links
 Baie-D'Urfe Commuter Train Station Information (RTM)
 Baie-D'Urfe Commuter Train Station Schedule (RTM)
 2016 STM System Map

Exo commuter rail stations
Railway stations in Montreal
Baie-D'Urfé